Redcedar bolts are relatively small (1 foot x 1 foot x 1 foot is common) cubes of Western Redcedar which are later processed into redcedar roof shingles.

Roofs
Woodworking